The 2021 Toronto FC season was the 15th season in the history of Toronto FC.

Due to COVID-19 cross-border restrictions imposed by the Canadian government, Toronto FC, along with the two other Canadian MLS teams (CF Montréal and the Vancouver Whitecaps FC), played in the United States at the beginning of the season while also sharing stadiums with other American MLS teams. From April 17 until July 16, Toronto FC played home matches at Orlando City SC's Exploria Stadium in Orlando, Florida. On July 14, MLS announced that Toronto FC were allowed to play two home matches on July 17 and 21, although they continued to work with the Canadian Government regarding plans on future home matches.

Outside of the MLS season, Toronto finished as the runners-up of the 2021 Canadian Championship after losing the final to rivals CF Montréal 1–0. They also reached the quarter-finals of the 2021 CONCACAF Champions League.

Squad
As of July 30, 2021.

Roster slots 
Toronto has six International roster slots and three Designated Player slots available for use in the 2021 season (players on the injured reserve do not take up an international slot). They traded an International roster spot for the 2021 season to FC Dallas in exchange for $225,000 of General Allocation Money (GAM) on April 20, 2021. They traded another international roster spot to Orlando City SC in exchange for $200,000 of General Allocation Money (GAM) on April 27, 2021.

Transfers
Note: All figures in United States dollars.

In

Transferred In

Loaned in

MLS SuperDraft picks

Out

Transferred out

Loaned out

Pre-season and friendlies

Matches

In-season

Competitions

Major League Soccer

League tables

Eastern Conference

Overall

Summary

Matches

2021 Canadian Championship

CONCACAF Champions League

Competitions summary
{| class="wikitable" style="text-align: center"
|-
!rowspan="2"|Competition
!colspan="8"|Record
!rowspan="2"|First Match
!rowspan="2"|Last Match
!rowspan="2"|Final Position
|-
!
!
!
!
!
!
!
!
|-
| MLS Regular Season

|April 17, 2021
|November 7, 2021
|13th in Eastern Conference, 26th Overall
|-
| Canadian Championship

|September 22, 2021
|November 21, 2021
|Runners-up
|-
| Champions League

|April 7, 2021
|May 4, 2021
|Quarter-finals
|-
! Total

!colspan="4"|

Goals
{| class="wikitable sortable" style="font-size:100%; text-align:center"
!width=15|Rank
!width=15|Nation
!width=130|Player
!width=50|Major League Soccer
!width=50|Canadian Championship
!width=50|Champions League
!width=50|Total
|-
|1||||Jonathan Osorio|| 3 || 0 || 1 ||4
|-
|2||||Ayo Akinola|| 3 || 0 || 0 ||3
|-
|rowspan=4|3||||Jozy Altidore|| 2 || 0 || 0 ||2
|-
|||Richie Laryea|| 2 || 0 || 0 ||2
|-
|||Patrick Mullins|| 1 || 0 || 1 ||2
|-
|||Yeferson Soteldo|| 2 || 0 || 0 ||2
|-
|rowspan=11|7||||Michael Bradley|| 1 || 0 || 0 ||1
|-
|||Nick DeLeon|| 1 || 0 || 0 ||1
|-
|||Marky Delgado|| 1 || 0 || 0 ||1
|-
|||Tsubasa Endoh|| 1 || 0 || 0 ||1
|-
|||Omar Gonzalez|| 1 || 0 || 0 ||1
|-
|||Kemar Lawrence|| 1 || 0 || 0 ||1
|-
|||Justin Morrow|| 0 || 0 || 1 ||1
|-
|||Alejandro Pozuelo|| 1 || 0 || 0 ||1
|-
|||Ralph Priso|| 1 || 0 || 0 ||1
|-
|||Jacob Shaffelburg|| 1 || 0 || 0 ||1
|-
|||Luke Singh|| 1 || 0 || 0 ||1
|-
|colspan="3"|Own goals
| 0 || 0 || 1 || 1
|- class="sortbottom"
! colspan="3"|Totals||23||0||4||27

Shutouts 
As of November 2, 2021
{| class="wikitable sortable" style="font-size:100%; text-align:center"
!width=15|Rank
!width=15|Nation
!width=130|Player
!width=15|Pos.
!width=50|Major League Soccer
!width=50|Canadian Championship
!width=50|Champions League
!width=50|Total
|-
|1||||Alex Bono|| GK || 2 || 1 || 0 ||3
|-
! colspan="4"|Totals||2||1||0||3

References

Notes

External links

Toronto FC seasons
Toronto FC
Toronto FC
Toronto